WKVG is a Southern Gospel formatted broadcast radio station licensed to Jenkins, Kentucky, serving Eastern Kentucky and Southwest Virginia.  WKVG is owned and operated by Martins & Associates Inc.

History
The station was assigned the WKVG call letters by the Federal Communications Commission on April 4, 1990.

References

External links
 Official Website
 
 
 FCC History Cards for WKVG

Southern Gospel radio stations in the United States
Jenkins, Kentucky
KVG

KVG